Rēti'a is the traditional coconut-based pudding of French Polynesia. It is made from mixing coconut milk, starch and sugar together and baked, the pudding having a similar consistency to gelatin.

The ingredients required and preparation make it extremely similar to another traditional Polynesian dessert, the Hawaiian haupia. The difference between the two desserts being that haupia is set by cooling similar to gelatin desserts while rēti'a is set by baking it, traditionally by cooking it in a heated underground pit or in modern times, an oven.

See also

 Coconut bar
 Haupia
 Maja blanca
 Tembleque

References

French Polynesian cuisine
Foods containing coconut